Grand Pro Wrestling (formerly Garage Pro Wrestling) or GPW is a British professional wrestling promotion based in the North West of England.

The promotion was founded in February 2003 by former British wrestler "The Middleman" Lee Butler. The promotions first event took place in July 2003. Events have been run regularly ever since.

In August 2004, Butler handed over the reins of the promotion to his senior trainees, retired from wrestling and hasn't been associated with the company since. Since January 2005, GPW has been run by British wrestler Johnnie Brannigan. However, the name 'Richard Noble' was used as the public-facing name up until Brannigan went public with his role in the company in April 2012.

The promotion is recognised for building much of its own stars through the training school, whilst using a mixture of more recognised British talent and lesser-known names.

Overview
The promotion runs shows in the North West of England, mainly in the Greater Manchester area at The Rose Club (formerly known as The Monaco Ballroom) in Hindley Wigan running between 8 and 10 times a year.

It has developed a large, passionate fan base and gained a reputation for one of the best storytelling wrestling companies on the independent scene. Its shows are known for their addictive, progressive storylines and strong characters. The promotion is also known for progressing many already established British and European wrestlers whilst shining a spotlight on their own homegrown talents.  Over the years, the promotion has been reluctant to use imports on their shows, favouring home bred, local wrestlers.

GPW has established several flagship shows that it has become known for, such as: Crazy Cruiser-8 (one night 8-man tournament show), "Only The Strong Survive" (survival themed show) "Thunderbrawl" (a Royal Rumble themed show), "Friday Night Thriller", promoted as an "unpredictable night of wrestling", "A Night To Remember" where the promotion and roster pay tribute to deceased roster members, Dom Travis and Kris Travis by wrestling in their memory and making a donation to MIND. This event also features the Grand Pro Wrestling Hall of Fame. "Back with a Bang" is the promotions traditional show to start a new year.

The promotion is credited with having started off many of today's British and American independent wrestlers' careers. Names include: Bubblegum, El Ligero, Claudio Castagnoli, Joey Hayes, "Dangerous" Damon Leigh, "Juice" CJ Banks, Dylan Roberts, Danny Hope, Jack Gallagher, Martin Kirby, Ricky J. McKenzie (Sam Gradwell), Lana Austin, Ste "Bin" Man and many more.

History
Here is a brief overview year by year of significant events in the company's rich history. 
 
The promotion's first show was in July 2003 and called "Defection" due to the number of wrestlers who had jumped ship from small time now-defunct promotion, NPWA. It was held at the Monaco Ballroom, Wigan. Wrestlers that night who are still active now are Johnnie "Heresy" Brannigan, "Dangerous" Damon Leigh and Joey Hayes.

In November 2003 GPW: promoted "Nemesis", It was a 450 sell out in Leigh and considered a breakout show for the promotion. The main event featured Heresy and Damon Leigh in a 30-foot balcony stunt.

During a tour of Cumbria in 2004, GPW crowned their first singles champion when Chris Hero defeated JC Thunder for the then International Title (now Heavyweight Title). in March 2004, the company ran a much hyped event originally promoted by a rival company who pulled out weeks before. GPW took over and renamed it "Hostile Takeover" with a main event featuring Chris Hero v. Claudio Castagnoli (a last minute replacement for Benito "Benny" Cuntapay).

During GPW: "Last Orders At The Legion" in January 2005 there was a well documented riot involving both wrestlers and audience. The storyline became very real to the passionate fan base and occurred when Alex Shane stole the British Title from then champion Damon Leigh. Local papers featured the events as headline news.

GPW: "Saturday Night Showdown" in July 2005 JC Thunder faced El Ligero in a main event hardcore match. The match was possibly the most controversial in British wrestling history and resulted in the venue banning professional wrestling from the Greater Manchester area. However, the following year GPW were allowed to return.

April 2006, GPW promoted "A Few Good Men", one of the only 30 Man Rumbles in the UK at that point.

GPW promoted Europe's first ever Survivor Series dedicated show in 2007.

July 2008 was the sell out 5th anniversary show; GPW: "V". In October 2008, GPW became the only European company to feature a Torneo cibernetico a match that has gone on to be a staple part of GPW shows and still a show that no one else in the UK has used.

In August 2010, GPW re-branded as Grand Pro Wrestling.

GPW presented its landmark 500th match in June 2011 at "Heroes & Villains". The special match was given to Zack Gibson and Jack Gallagher who fought for the British Title.

In 2012, the company entered into an inter-promotional feud with Morecambe-based promotion XWA in what many consider to be the best inter-promotional feud in British Wrestling history. GPW eventually won and XWA closed down as a result.

January 2013 saw the start of the company's 10th-year celebrations. July 2010 brought a sell-out audience to attend GPW: "X", the official 10th anniversary. The show featured a Past, Present, Future 15 Man Battle Royal. 5 names from the present roster, 5 names from the past and 5 debuting new characters. A match which typifies the promotions values.

Grand Pro Wrestling opened up their Hall of Fame in 2015. The year also saw the first ever tag team Dumpster Match.

2016 saw one of the most acclaimed British feuds of the year involving T-Bone, Bubblegum, Lana Austin, Dylan Roberts and both the British and the Heavyweight Titles, 2016 was also the first time the promotion launched their "Fast Track 4-Way" match, a match exclusive to GPW. The rules are that 4 competitors enter a 4-way rules match, the winner of the match is allowed to cash a title shot in on any of the titles but it has to be done that night. The person pinned in the match is no longer permitted to enter for the rest of the year, the other two not involved in the win, or the loss are allowed to re-enter next time. Typically, the Fast Track matches happen every other show.

In February 2017 the promotion announced its first ever Women's Tournament to take place throughout the year.

In July 2018 the promotion celebrated its 15th anniversary and it was on this night that Joey Hayes ended Dylan Roberts unprecedented 694 day Heavyweight Title reign.

Championships

There are three championships in the promotion. The heavyweight title is regarded as the main title, the British title as the mid-level title, and tfinally he tag team trophy.

Johnnie "Heresy" Brannigan, "Dangerous" Damon Leigh, Joey Hayes, Sam Gradwell, Tyson T-Bone and Ste "Bin" Mann are the only grand slam winners, i.e. have held all three titles at different times.

In 2012, there was a fourth, now defunct title. Jack Gallagher introduced Gallagher's dold, his own title which he eventually lost to Ste "Bin" Man in November 2012, who disposed of the title. Prior to the loss, Gallagher had successfully defended the title against Joey Hayes and in a High Stakes 4-Way Match featuring Martin Kirby, Cyanide and Dirk Feelgood.

GPW Heavyweight Championship

 Between March 2004 and October 2006, the Heavyweight Title was defended Internationally and therefore known as the International Title. Now only competed for domestically, from 2006 it has been known as The Heavyweight Title

GPW British Championship

GPW Tag Team Trophy

Hall of fame
19 June 2015, after 12 years of business, Grand Pro Wrestling opened the doors to a hall of fame.

The company will induct new members once a year at their "A Night To Remember" show. The hall of fame was opened by company co-booker, Jiggy Walker who had organised it without owner, Johnnie Brannigan's knowledge. It was Walker who made Brannigan the first inductee of the hall of fame.  Brannigan has carried on the tradition of not telling inductees when they are going in until their name is announced.

Crazy Cruiser-8 tournament
The Crazy Cruiser-8 is an eight-man one night tournament, and one of the shows GPW has become synonymous with. The eight entrants into the tournament are cruiserweights. Heavyweights are not permitted entry into the tournament. Qualifying matches are contested months prior to the tournament either in traditional one on one matches, 4-ways, 3-ways or in a "Last Chance Saloon battle royal". Byes passed the preliminaries have been given in the past to established foreign entrants, eligible reigning Champions and "the fans choice".

The eventual winner of the tournament would have not only been successful in the preliminaries, but have won three times in a row on the night of the tournament itself. The winner does not defend his title the following year.

2006
The first CC-8 tournament was 3 November 2006 and the final eight men were:
 Kris Travis
 El Ligero
 Joseph Hayes
 Emil Sitoci
 Darkside
 Bubblegum
 "The Model" Danny Hope
 "Juice" CJ Banks

The eventual winner was Bubblegum after he defeated Joseph Hayes in the final.

2008
The second Crazy Cruiser tournament was known as CC-08 and competed on 2 May 2008. The final eight men were:
 Jack Toxic
 El Ligero
 "The Model" Danny Hope
 Jiggy Walker
 "Juice" CJ Banks
 "Super" Sam Bailey
 Chris Echo
 Voodoo

CJ Banks was the eventual winner after defeating Chris Echo in the final.

2009
The third Crazy Cruiser tournament was competed on 13 November 2009 and saw new rules on qualifying. 2 top seeds were selected as automatic qualifiers (Joey Hayes & Bubblegum). Other qualifiers were decided through a first ever Fan's Choice, a 4-Way Qualifier, The Last Chance Battle Royal and the return of the International Entrant. The final eight men were:

 Max Damon
 Joey Hayes
 Fox Carter
 The Juice
 Bubblegum
 Martin Kirby
 Ricky J. McKenzie
 Dylan Roberts

Joey Hayes was the eventual winner after defeating CC8 2008 Champion, Juice in the final.

2013
The fourth Crazy Cruiser tournament was competed on 29 November 2013.  The final eight men were:

 El Ligero
 Joey Hayes
 Jack Gallagher
 Kris Travis
 Bubblegum
 Zack Gibson
 Jim Nastic
 Dylan Roberts
El Ligero was the eventual winner after defeating Zack Gibson in the final.

2018
The fifth Crazy Cruiser tournament was competed on 30 November 2018.  The final eight participants were:

 CJ Banks
 Jack Griffith
 Lana Austin
 LA Austin
 Soner Dursun
 Isaiah Quinn
 Sandy Beach
 Jet Fashion

Sandy Beach was the eventual winner after defeating Lana Austin in the final.

North West Rookie League

GPW have always championed their own trainees and in 2011, they launched a first ever North West Rookie League that would give a stage to perform on for eight brand new characters from not just their own school, but nearby schools as well.

The NWRL was very well received, and in 2015, they ran it again in a different format. Historically, the winners of the league have received a shot at the British title.

2011

In 2011, Grand Pro Wrestling introduced the first ever North West Rookie League. The first League featured two teams, one captained by Axl Rage and one captained by The Great Suzuki. Each month, the two teams would square off and the loser in each match would be eliminated. The Great Suzuki's team triumphed in the final when Ste "Bin" Mann, (the sole survivor on Team Suzuki) defeated Jason Logan, (the sole survivor on Team Rage) at GPW "Night of the Brave" in November 2011.

Team Suzuki
 Action Jackson
 Jynx
 LA Austin
 Ste "Bin" Man (Winner)

Team Rage
 JD Sassoon
 Ken Zen
 Skull Crusher
 Jason Logan (Runner-up)

2015

In 2015, GPW reintroduced the North West Rookie League with a revised format. This time, instead of two teams of 4, GPW Pro's would team with GPW Rookies in a points based tournament. Below are the current standings as of 24 July 2015.

On 18 September 2015 at GPW "Back To School", Dylan Roberts and Danxig defeated The Circus via pinfall. As a result of their victory, Danxig was declared winner of the North West Rookie League 2015. Earlier in the night, Alex Jones-Casey defeated Matthew Brooks and Jimmy Jackson to finish in third place.

2015 Rookie League final standings

Winner: Danxig

Second Place: Nicholas Cartier

Third Place: Alex Jones-Casey

GPW training school
Established when the promotion first started in 2003, the training school has gone from strength to strength and turned out some of the best wrestlers on the European circuit. A long list of names both past and current have come through the training school. Most noteworthy perhaps WWE competitor Sam Gradwell (Ricky J. McKenzie). Other notable names to have come from the school are: Joey Hayes, Damon Leigh, Danny Hope, CJ Banks, Matthew Brooks, The Island Brothers, Jet Fashion, Ste "Bin" Man, Lana Austin, Dylan Roberts, the Bad Lads and many more.

The training facility is based in the heart of Manchester with regular classes. The head trainer is Johnnie "Heresy" Brannigan who has been at the helm of GPW training since 2006. Other graduates and established British wrestlers are also involved in the development of trainees.

See also

Professional wrestling in the United Kingdom
List of professional wrestling promotions in the United Kingdom

References

External links

British professional wrestling promotions
2003 establishments in the United Kingdom